Nepal competed at the 2014 Winter Olympics in Sochi, Russia from 7 to 23 February 2014. Dachhiri Sherpa represented the country again (as he did in the previous two Winter Olympics) as the only athlete. A contingent of seven officials and one coach were also part of the Nepali delegation. Sherpa competed in his final games during the 15 km classical race.

Cross-country skiing 

According to the final quota allocation released on January 20, 2014, Nepal had one athlete in qualification position. Dachhiri Sherpa finished his only race in 86th position (out of 87 athletes that completed the race).

Distance

References

External links 
Nepal at the 2014 Winter Olympics

Nations at the 2014 Winter Olympics
2014
2014 in Nepalese sport